Amdalai is a town in western Gambia. It is located in Kombo North/Saint Mary District in the Western Division.  As of 2008, it has an estimated population of 1,245.

References

External links
Satellite map at Maplandia

Populated places in the Gambia
Kombo North/Saint Mary